The FAI Cup 1921–22 was the first ever edition of Ireland's premier cup competition, The Football Association of Ireland Challenge Cup or FAI Cup. The tournament began on 14 January 1922 and concluded on 8 April with the final replay held at Dalymount Park, Dublin. An official attendance of 10,000 people watched St James's Gate complete the League and Cup Double by defeating Shamrock Rovers in a fixture marred by violence. The winning goal was scored by John "Jack" Kelly.

First round

Second round

Semi-finals

Semi-final Replay

Final

Final replay

Notes
A.  Attendances were calculated using gate receipts which limited their accuracy as a large proportion of people, particularly children, attended football matches in Ireland throughout the 20th century for free by a number of means.

References
General

Specific

External links
FAI Website

1921-22
1921–22 in Irish association football
FAI Cup